Thomas William Fox (July 7, 1951 – March 9, 2006) was an American Quaker peace activist, affiliated with Christian Peacemaker Teams (CPT) in Iraq. He was kidnapped on November 26, 2005, in Baghdad along with three other CPT activists, leading to the 2005-2006 Christian Peacemaker hostage crisis. His body was found on March 9, 2006.

Life and career
From Clear Brook, Virginia, Fox graduated from the Peabody College of Vanderbilt University, and was a member of the Phi Mu Alpha Sinfonia musical fraternity. In his career, he was a leader of youth programs at Langley Hill Friends Meeting in McLean, Virginia. Fox served in many positions in Baltimore Yearly Meeting, including a stint as Youth Programs Director, where he devoted much of his time to personally working with teenagers and young adults in the Baltimore Yearly Meeting community; he served as a Friendly Adult Presence, during the majority of the BYM Young Friends program's gatherings during the first half of the 2000s (decade) and the later 1990s. He served for 20 years in the United States Marine Band and was an accomplished player of clarinet and recorder. In a public statement his daughter Katherine mentioned that on principle he refused military discounts for which he was eligible.

Iraq hostage crisis
On November 26, 2005, Fox was taken hostage along with three other members of the CPT team in Iraq. The captors threatened to kill all hostages unless the United States freed all Iraqi prisoners held in the US and Iraq by December 8, 2005. They later extended this deadline to December 10, 2005. On December 10, 2005, Katherine Fox issued a statement saying that she and her father believe the Iraqi people have legitimate concerns about the United States' presence in Iraq, but "these grievances, however, will not be resolved by taking my father's life."

On March 7, 2006 Al Jazeera aired a tape which showed the other three hostages, but did not show Fox. On March 10, 2006, the U.S. State Department announced that Fox's body had been found on a garbage heap in Baghdad, shot through the head and chest. According to Iraqi police, his hands were bound and signs of torture were evident.  However, conflicting reports from an anonymous Iraqi police official and members of CPT stated that there were no signs of torture. The autopsy report was not released.

On March 23, 2006, the remaining hostages were freed by multinational forces. Muharib Abdul-Latif al-Jubouri (an Al-Qaeda in Iraq leader) is believed to have personally killed Fox. Al-Jubouri was killed in May 2007.

See also

Harmeet Singh Sooden
Norman Kember
James Loney
List of kidnappings
List of peace activists
List of solved missing person cases
List of unsolved murders

Bibliography
 Florence Fullerton, Tribute to a Peacemaker : Our Friend Tom Fox, followed by Waitinginthelight.blogspot.com Selected Entries From Tom Fox's blog, FWCC - Wider Quaker Fellowship, Philadelphia, 2006, 15 p.

References

External links
 Tom Fox's blog
 David Cook: The Story Of Tom Fox - And Response, opinion column, The Chattanoogan, 9 Dec 2005
 Christian Peacemaker Teams
 Tom Fox Memorial from Christian Peacemaker Teams
 Free The Captives: Petition for the release of Christian Peacemakers being held in Iraq and memorial page for Tom Fox
 Links to articles about Tom's capture
 Song For Tom Fox by The Tremulance

1951 births
2000s missing person cases
2006 deaths
21st-century Quakers
American Christian pacifists
American people taken hostage
American Quakers
Foreign hostages in Iraq
Formerly missing people
Kidnapped people
Male murder victims
Missing person cases in Iraq
Quakerism in Maryland
Quakerism in Virginia
Religious leaders from Tennessee
Religious leaders from Virginia
United States Marines
Unsolved murders in Iraq